The Treaties of Buffalo Creek are a series of treaties, named for the Buffalo River in New York, between the United States and Native American peoples:

These include the following:

 First Treaty of Buffalo Creek (1788) 
 Second Treaty of Buffalo Creek (1838) 
 Third Treaty of Buffalo Creek (1842) 
 Fourth Treaty of Buffalo Creek (1857)

United States and Native American treaties
Native American history of New York (state)